The 19165 / 19166 Ahmedabad–Darbhanga Sabarmati Express is an Express train of the Indian Railways connecting  in Gujarat and   in Bihar. It is currently being operated with 19165/19166 train numbers on three days in week.

Service

It averages 42 km/hr as 19165 Sabarmati Express and covers 1946 km in 46 hrs 25 mins & 41 km/hr as 19166 Sabarmati Express and covers 1946 km in 47 hrs 50 mins.

Schedule

Route & halts

The important halts of the train are:

Shahganj Junction

Coach composition

The train consists of 22 coaches:
 1 AC II Tier
 2 AC III Tier
 13 Sleeper coaches
 4 General
 2 Second-class Luggage/parcel van

Traction

As the route is yet to be fully electrified, it is hauled by a Vadodara Electric Loco Shed-based WAP-4E / WAP-5 locomotive from Ahmedabad Junction up to  handing over to a  Ratlam Diesel Loco Shed-based WDM-3A / WDM-3D locomotive for the remainder of the journey until Darbhanga Junction.

Direction reversal

The train reverses its direction 3 times at:

Rake sharing

The train sharing ita rake with 19167/19168 Sabarmati Express

See also 

 Sabarmati Express
 Darbhanga–Ahmedabad Antyodaya Express

References

Rail transport in Gujarat
Rail transport in Madhya Pradesh
Rail transport in Uttar Pradesh
Rail transport in Bihar
Transport in Ahmedabad
Express trains in India
Transport in Darbhanga
Named passenger trains of India